Deborah Cornelius is a British actress who has appeared in numerous roles in film and television. She has most recently been seen in ITV’s prime time Sunday night drama, Mr Selfridge, as the character Miss Blenkinsop, Mr Selfridge's nervy yet faithful secretary. Cornelius appeared in all 10 episodes of series one. She has also appeared in a number of high-profile TV dramas including A Dance to the Music of Time, Agatha Christie's Poirot, Take a Girl Like You, The Trail of Gemma Lang,  Silent Witness, Hidden, Law & Order UK,  Wire in the Blood, Lewis, Jekyll, and A Civil Arrangement.
Along with television and film, Cornelius has starred in many theatre productions, including roles in Pygmalion at The Noel Coward Theatre, London and The Fall Guy at The Manchester Royal Exchange. Cornelius is represented by Michael Ford at Hatch Talent.

Cornelius is married to Steve Brown, the British composer and record producer, who co-wrote I Can't Sing! The X Factor Musical, with the comedian Harry Hill

References

British television actresses
Living people
Year of birth missing (living people)
Date of birth missing (living people)